"" (Cross that I look at) is a Christian hymn with words in German written by Eckart Bücken in 1982, with a melody by Lothar Graap. It appeared in Protestant and Catholic hymnals, and other songbooks.

History 
, a Protestant pastor, wrote the text of "" in 1982, reflecting the Cross.  composed a melody the same year.

The song became part of the Protestant hymnal Evangelisches Gesangbuch as EG 598, and of the Catholic hymnal Gotteslob as GL 270. It is also part of other songbooks.

References

External links 
 Evangelisches Gesangbuch 598 l4a.org
 

20th-century hymns in German
1982 songs